Tower Semiconductor Ltd. is an Israeli company that manufactures integrated circuits using specialty process technologies, including SiGe, BiCMOS, Silicon Photonics, SOI, mixed-signal and RFCMOS, CMOS image sensors, non-imaging sensors, power management (BCD), and non-volatile memory (NVM) as well as MEMS capabilities. Tower Semiconductor also owns 51% of TPSCo, an enterprise with Nuvoton Technology Corporation Japan (NTCJ).

Overview
The company manufactures specialty analog integrated circuits for semiconductor companies such as: On Semiconductor, Intel, Broadcom, Panasonic, Teledyne, Samsung, Skyworks Solutions, Semtech and Vishay – Siliconix. Moreover, the company also has Qualified open foundry Silicon Photonics platform which is used by companies such as Inphi Corporation.
Tower Semiconductor operates seven manufacturing facilities: Fab 1 and Fab 2 (150mm and 200mm) located in Migdal Haemek, Israel, Fab 3 and Fab 9 (200mm) located in Newport Beach, California and in San Antonio, Texas and three additional fabs (two 200mm and one 300mm) through TPSCo located in the Hokuriku region of Japan. In addition, Tower Semiconductor operates a worldwide design center in Netanya, Israel.

Tower Semiconductor is an Israeli public company that is traded on NASDAQ and the Tel Aviv Stock Exchange, both under the ticker TSEM, and is included in the TA-35 Index and the TA BlueTech Index. In 2010, Tower Semiconductor became the #1 specialty foundry by revenue, with 70% revenue growth year-over-year.

History
Tower Semiconductor was founded in 1993, with the acquisition of National Semiconductor’s 150mm wafer fabrication facility. Tower became a public company in 1994 and shares are traded on NASDAQ (TSEM) and Tel Aviv Stock Exchange (TSEM). In January 2001, an adjacent facility (Fab 2) was constructed.

In September 2008, Tower acquired Jazz Semiconductor in a stock for stock transaction. In November 2009, the combined companies officially launched as TowerJazz.

In June 2011, TowerJazz acquired Micron Technology's fabrication facility in Nishiwaki City, Hyogo, Japan. The acquisition nearly doubled TowerJazz's 2010 internal manufacturing capacity and cost-effectively increased production by 60,000 wafers per month.

In April 2014, TowerJazz announced the successful transaction with Panasonic Corporation (First Section of TSE and NSE ticker: 6752) to form a newly established Japanese company, TowerJazz Panasonic Semiconductor Co. (TPSCo) for the manufacture of Panasonic and additional third-party products. TowerJazz announced cessation of its Nishiwaki facility operations in the course of rationalizing and restructuring its manufacturing and business activities in Japan. This enables the company to reduce its annual fixed costs by approximately $130 million per annum.

In February 2016, TowerJazz announced the successful acquisition of an 8-inch wafer fabrication facility in San Antonio, Texas, United States from Maxim Integrated Products, Inc., the consideration, of $40 million was paid by approximately 3.3 million ordinary TowerJazz shares. This acquisition increased TowerJazz's production by 28,000 wafers per month.

On 21 August 2017,  TowerJazz, and Tacoma (Nanjing) Semiconductor Technology Co., Ltd announced that TowerJazz received a first payment from Tacoma (Nanjing) according to their agreement for establishing a partnership to build a wafer fab in China. TowerJazz would provide its technical knowledge and project management skills, meanwhile Tacoma (Nanjing), and a Chinese regional authorities named Nanjing Economic and Technology Development Zone, would fully support and fund the project. On 22 June 2020, the Chinese court announced that Tacoma (Nanjing) Semiconductor Technology Co., Ltd was in bankruptcy proceedings.

On March 1, 2020, TowerJazz announced a new brand identity. As of March 2020, the company's official brand name is Tower Semiconductor and includes all of the company's worldwide subsidiaries.

On February 15, 2022, Intel announced an agreement to acquire Tower Semiconductor for $5.4 billion.

Fabrication facilities

Fab 1 6" Migdal Haemek, Israel
Fab 1, located in Migdal Haemek, Israel is a 150mm (wafer diameter) facility which was acquired from National Semiconductor in 1993 at the time of Tower Semiconductor's founding. 
Since that time, Fab 1 has been significantly modernized and offers process geometries ranging from 1.0-micron to 0.35-micron including CMOS image sensors, embedded flash and mixed-signal technologies.

Fab 2 8" Migdal Haemek, Israel
Fab 2, a 200mm wafer facility was constructed in January 2001, adjacent to Fab 1 in Migdal Haemek, Israel and was designed to operate in geometries of 0.18-micron and below, using advanced CMOS technology.

Fab 3 8" Newport Beach, CA
Fab 3, located in Newport Beach, California, United States was acquired by Tower when it merged with Jazz Technologies in 2008. Jazz Semiconductor was formed in 2002 and inherited the 200mm facility that was once operated by Rockwell Semiconductor. At Fab 3, Jazz established SiGe, BiCMOS and MEMS technologies and expanded upon its heritage for on-shore, specialized foundry services focused on the Aerospace and Defense industry.

Fab 9 8" San Antonio, Texas
Fab 9, located in San Antonio, Texas, United States was acquired by Tower in 2016 from Maxim Integrated.

Additional fabs through TPSCo 
TPSCo is 51% owned by Tower Semiconductor Ltd. (NASDAQ: TSEM, TASE: TSEM) and 49% owned by Nuvoton Technology Corporation Japan (NTCJ). TPSCo has three (only two are working) manufacturing facilities in Hokuriku, Japan (Uozu, Tonami, and not working Arai) which have been producing large scale integrated circuits for over 30 years. Areas of process technology focus include high dynamic range image sensors (CIS and CCD), integrated power devices (BCD, SOI and LDMOS) and high frequency silicon RFCMOS. TPSCo offers both IDMs and fabless companies over 120 qualified silicon process flows on 200mm and 300mm substrates from super micron to 45 nm, as well as internal back end processing, assembly and test services.

Process Technology Offerings 
Tower Semiconductor offers a broad range of advanced analog process technologies. The company's analog technology offerings include: SiGe BiCMOS, Silicon Photonics, and RF CMOS (SOI and bulk) for radio frequency (RF) and high performance analog (HPA) applications; CMOS image sensor (CIS); non-imaging sensors, power management, including 700V BCD; CMOS; Mixed-Signal CMOS and MEMS capabilities. Tower Semiconductor's modular and customizable processes are available on either 150mm, 200mm or 300mm wafers in its seven fabrication facilities.

See also
Foundry model
Semiconductor device fabrication
Science and technology in Israel
Silicon Wadi

References

Foundry semiconductor companies
Semiconductor companies of Israel
Announced information technology acquisitions
Computer companies established in 1993
Electronics companies established in 1993
Israeli brands
Companies listed on the Tel Aviv Stock Exchange

Israeli companies established in 1993
Announced mergers and acquisitions
Intel acquisitions